Wilhelm Wirth (26 July 1876, Wunsiedel - 13 July 1952, Amberg) was a German psychologist. He was taught by Wilhelm Wundt.

External links 
 http://www.uni-leipzig.de/~psycho/hist2.html
 

1876 births
1952 deaths
People from Wunsiedel
People from the Kingdom of Bavaria
German psychologists
19th-century German people
20th-century German people